Karamabad Haq Nader (also Romanized as Karamābād Haq Nader) is a village in Yusefvand Rural District, in the Central District of Selseleh County, Lorestan Province, Iran. At the 2006 census, its population was 202, in 44 families.

References 

Towns and villages in Selseleh County